The 99th Infantry Division was formed in 1942 and deployed overseas in 1944. The "Checkerboard" or "Battle Babies" division landed at the French port of Le Havre and proceeded northeast to Belgium. During the heavy fighting in the Battle of the Bulge, the unit suffered many casualties, yet tenaciously held its defensive position. In March 1945, the 99th advanced into the Rhineland, crossing the Rhine River at Remagen on March 11. After fighting in the Ruhr area, the unit moved southward into Bavaria, where it was located at the end of the war.

The 99th Infantry Division, the "Checkerboard" division, gained its nickname from the division's insignia. The insignia was devised upon the 99th's formation in 1942 when the division was headquartered in the city of Pittsburgh. The blue and white checkerboard in the division's insignia is taken from the coat of arms of William Pitt, for whom Pittsburgh is named. The division was also known as the "Battle Babies" during 1945, a sobriquet coined by a United Press correspondent when the division was first mentioned in press reports during the Battle of the Bulge.

On May 3–4, 1945, as the 99th moved deeper into Bavaria, it liberated one of a number of Dachau subcamps near the town of Mühldorf. The unit reported on May 4 that it had "liberated 3 labor camps and 1 concentration camp." The concentration camp was one of the "forest camps" (Waldlager) tied to the Mühldorf camp complex. The 99th Infantry's report stated that 1,500 Jews were "living under terrible conditions and approximately 600 required hospitalization due to starvation and disease."

The 99th Infantry Division was recognized as a liberating unit by the US Army's Center of Military History and the United States Holocaust Memorial Museum in 1992.

World War I

The 99th Division was constituted at Camp Wheeler, Georgia, on 23 July 1918. Plans called for the division to include the 393rd, 394th, 395th, and 396th Infantry Regiments.  Organization and training began in October but were not complete by the time the war ended in November 1918, so the division was demobilized in early 1919. No division commander was appointed during the organization's brief existence.

Interwar period

The division was reconstituted in the Organized Reserve on 24 June 1921 and assigned to the western half of the state of Pennsylvania. The division headquarters was organized in November 1921. The division was chiefly manned with graduates of the ROTC programs of the Carnegie Institute of Technology, Duquesne University. Pennsylvania State College, and the Pennsylvania Military College.

World War II
Ordered into active military service: 15 November 1942 Camp Van Dorn, Mississippi.
Overseas: 30 September 1944
Campaigns: Rhineland, Ardennes-Alsace, Central Europe
Days of combat: 151
Returned to U.S.: 17 September 1945
Inactivated: 15 October 1945, Camp Patrick Henry, Virginia

Order of battle

Headquarters, 99th Infantry Division
393rd Infantry Regiment
394th Infantry Regiment
395th Infantry Regiment
Headquarters and Headquarters Battery, 99th Infantry Division Artillery
370th Field Artillery Battalion (105 mm)
371st Field Artillery Battalion (105 mm)
372nd Field Artillery Battalion (155 mm)
924th Field Artillery Battalion (105 mm)
 324th Engineer Combat Battalion
 324th Medical Battalion
 99th Cavalry Reconnaissance Troop (Mechanized)
 Headquarters, Special Troops, 99th Infantry Division
 Headquarters Company, 99th Infantry Division
 799th Ordnance Light Maintenance Company
 99th Quartermaster Company
 99th Signal Company
 Military Police Platoon
 Band
99th Counterintelligence Corps Detachment

Many members of the 99th Infantry Division had participated in the Army Specialized Training Program or ASTP, derisively nicknamed "all safe 'till peace;" in February 1944, the program was drawn down, and the majority of its members were assigned to later-deploying divisions such as the 99th.

Combat chronicle

 Arrival in Europe

The 99th Infantry Division, comprising the 393rd, 394th, and the 395th Infantry Regiments, arrived in England on 10 October 1944. Put under the operational control of V Corps, First Army, it moved to Le Havre, France on 3 November and proceeded to Aubel, Belgium, to prepare to enter the front lines.

 Battle of the Bulge

The division first saw action on 9 November, taking over the defense of the sector north of the Roer River between Schmidt and Monschau, a distance of nearly 19 miles. After defensive patrolling, the 99th probed the Siegfried Line against heavy resistance on 13 December. Formerly nicknamed the "Checkerboard Division," which referred to its shoulder patch, in late 1944 having not yet seen battle, the division was nicknamed the "Battle Babies." 

The 99th Infantry Division, outnumbered five to one, inflicted estimated casualties on the Germans in the ratio of eighteen to one. The division lost about 20% of its effective strength, including 465 killed and 2,524 evacuated due to wounds, injuries, fatigue, or trench foot; German losses were much higher. In the northern sector opposite the 99th, this included more than 4,000 deaths and the destruction of 60 tanks and big guns. Historian John S.D. Eisenhower wrote, "... the action of the 2nd and 99th Divisions on the northern shoulder could be considered the most decisive of the Ardennes campaign."

The stiff American defense prevented the Germans from reaching the vast array of supplies near the Belgian cities of Liège and Spa and the road network west of the Elsenborn Ridge leading to the Meuse River. After more than ten days of intense battle, they pushed the Americans out of the villages, but were unable to dislodge them from the ridge, where elements of the V Corps of the First U.S. Army prevented the German forces from reaching the road network to their west.

The inexperienced troops of the division were lodged on the northern shoulder of the Ardennes Offensive on 16 December. Although cut up and surrounded in part, the 99th was one of the only divisions that did not yield to the German attack, and held their positions until reinforcements arrived. The lines were then moved back to form defensive positions east of Elsenborn Ridge on the 19th. Here it held firmly against violent enemy attacks. From 21 December 1944 to 30 January 1945, the unit was engaged in aggressive patrolling and reequipping. It attacked toward the Monschau Forest, on 1 February, mopping up and patrolling until it was relieved for training and rehabilitation, on 13 February.

 Stand at Lanzerath

The Intelligence and Reconnaissance Platoon, 394th Infantry Regiment, 99th Division was the most decorated platoon for a single action of World War II. During the first morning of the Battle of the Bulge, they defended a key road junction in the vicinity of the Losheim Gap. Led by 20-year-old Lieutenant Lyle Bouck Jr., they delayed the advance of the 1st SS Panzer Division, the spearhead of the entire German 6th Panzer Army, for nearly 20 hours. In a long fight with about 500 men of the 1st Battalion, 9th Fallschirmjaeger Regiment, 3rd Fallschirmjaeger Division, the 18 men of the platoon along with four artillery observers inflicted between 60 to more than 100 casualties on the Germans. The platoon seriously disrupted the entire German Sixth Panzer Army's schedule of attack along the northern edge of the offensive. At dusk on 16 December, after virtually no sleep during the preceding night and a full day of almost non-stop combat, with only a few rounds of ammunition remaining, about 50 German paratroopers finally flanked and captured the remaining 19 soldiers. Two men who had been sent on foot to regimental headquarters to seek reinforcements were later captured. Fourteen of the 18 platoon members were wounded, while only one soldier, a member of the artillery observation team, was killed.

Because the unit's radios had been destroyed, the soldiers captured, and the rapid subsequent German advance, U.S. Army commanders did not know about the unit's success at slowing the German advance, or even if they had been captured or killed. The platoon members were not recognized for their courageous deeds for thirty-seven years. On 25 October 1981, the entire platoon was recognized with a Presidential Unit Citation. Every member of the platoon was decorated, which included four Distinguished Service Crosses, five Silver Stars and ten Bronze Stars with "V" devices signifying awards for valor in combat.

 Advance into Germany
On 2 March 1945, the division took the offensive, moving toward Cologne and crossing the Erft Canal near Glesch. After clearing towns west of the Rhine, it crossed the Ludendorff Bridge at Remagen on the 11th. The 99th Infantry Division was the first complete division to cross the Rhine. They continued to Linz am Rhein and to the Wied River. Crossing on the 23d, it pushed east on the Koln-Frankfurt highway to Giessen. Against light resistance, it crossed the Dill River and pushed on to Krofdorf-Gleiberg, taking Giessen 29 March. The 99th then moved to Schwarzenau, on 3 April, and attacked the southeast sector of the Ruhr Pocket on the 5th. Although the enemy resisted fiercely, the Ruhr pocket collapsed with the fall of Iserlohn, on 16 April.

The last drive began on 23 April. The 99th crossed the Ludwig Canal against stiff resistance and established a bridgehead over the Altmuhl River, 25 April. The division crossed the Danube near Eining on the 27th and after a stubborn fight the Isar at Landshut on 1 May. On 3-4 May, the division liberated two labor camps and a "forest camp" (Waldlager) related to the Mühldorf concentration camp, a sub-camp of Dachau. The 99th Infantry's after action report stated they found 1,500 Jews "living under terrible conditions and approximately 600 required hospitalization due to starvation and disease." The division continued to attack without opposition to the Inn River and Giesenhausen until VE-day.

Casualties
Total battle casualties: 6,553
Killed in action: 993
Wounded in action: 4,177
Missing in action: 247
Prisoner of war: 1,136

Unit assignments
4 November 1944: V Corps, First United States Army, 12th Army Group
18 December 1944: Attached to 2nd Infantry Division of the V Corps, First Army, 12th Army Group
20 December 1944: Attached, with the entire First Army, to the British 21st Army Group
7 January 1945: Relieved from attachment to the 2nd Infantry Division and assigned to V Corps, First Army (attached to the British 21st Army Group), 12th Army Group
18 January 1945: V Corps, First Army, 12th Army Group
20 February 1945: VII Corps
9 March 1945: III Corps
19 April 1945: III Corps, Third Army, 12th Army Group

Commendations and honors
Distinguished Unit Citations: 2
Distinguished Service Cross (United States)- 16
Distinguished Service Medal (U.S. Army)-1
 Silver Star- 252
Legion of Merit- 6
DFC- 7
Soldier's Medal-8
Bronze Star – 2,127
Air Medal- 48
Medal of Honor-1

The Medal of Honor was awarded T/Sgt Vernon McGarity, Company L, 393rd Infantry, 99th Infantry Division, for actions taken near Krinkelt, Belgium, on 16 December 1944 during the opening phases of the Ardennes Offensive.

When the Ardennes Offensive ended, Gen. Lauer received verbal commendations from Field Marshal Sir Bernard L. Montgomery, 21st Army Group Commander, and Gen. Courtney Hodges, First Army Commander, on the vigorous and effective defense contributed by the 99th.

A written commendation was received from Maj. Gen. Leonard T. Gerow, V Corps Commander:

Commanding officers
Maj. Gen. Thompson Lawrence (November 1942 – July 1943)
Maj. Gen. Walter E. Lauer (July 1943 – 18 August 1945)
Brig. Gen. Frederick H. Black (August 1945 to inactivation)

Unit insignia
The unit's distinctive shoulder patch consisted of a five-sided shield of black on which is superimposed a horizontal band of white and blue squares. The black represents the iron from the mills of Pittsburgh, Pennsylvania where many of the troops were from. The blue and white are taken from the coat of arms for William Pitt for whom Pittsburgh was named.  There are nine white squares and nine blue ones, signifying the number 99.

Reactivation

On 22 December 1967, the 99th Army Reserve Command (ARCOM) was activated. While the 99th ARCOM was allowed to wear the shoulder sleeve insignia of the 99th Infantry Division and use its number, Department of the Army policy does not allow for the lineage of MTOE units, such as infantry divisions, to be perpetuated by TDA units, such as ARCOMs. In 1975, the 99th ARCOM moved its headquarters to Oakdale, Pennsylvania.
 
After Iraq invaded Kuwait in August 1990, 22 99th units deployed to Saudi Arabia, Europe, and other locations. After the Gulf War, the 99th ARCOM became the 99th Regional Support Command (RSC). The 99th RSC's mission was to provide command and control and full-service support for assigned units and facility management.

On 23 Dec. 1996, the 99th RSC mobilized the first of six units for deployment to Operation Joint Endeavor in support of peacekeeping missions in Bosnia. The 99th RSC continued to support operations in the Balkan Republics while providing refuge to those fleeing Kosovo as they sought temporary recovery in the United States.

Following the 11 September 2001, terrorist attacks, the 99th mobilized large numbers of Army Reserve Soldiers. While the 99th was fully involved in this large mobilization, the headquarters moved to Coraopolis, Pennsylvania. In January 2003, the 99th RSC started mobilizing units for projected operations in Iraq.
 
On 16 July 2003, the command was redesignated as the 99th Regional Readiness Command, placing additional emphasis on training, readiness, and mobilization. The 99th RRC continued to provide command and control for assigned units and support for the ongoing deployments.
 
In 2005, the Army Reserve began its latest transformation under the Base Realignment and Closure (BRAC) directive and lessons learned from eight years of deployments in support of the Global War on Terrorism. The 10 geographically-based RRCs, including the 99th, were inactivated and replaced with four regional base operations commands. The 99th was selected as one of these new regional support commands.
 
In September 2007, in preparation for the transition to Fort Dix and establishment of the new 99th RSC, the 99th RRC assumed administrative responsibility for the former regions of the 77th and 94th RRCs, which had inactivated. On 17 September 2008, the 99th Regional Support Command was activated at Fort Dix, N.J. The 99th RSC's mission was to provide base operations functions for the assigned 13-state Northeast Region.

Lineage

The U.S. Army Center of Military History states that the 99th RSC does not perpetuate the lineage and honors of the 99th Infantry Division. Army policy does not allow for the lineage and honors of a TO&E organization, such as an infantry division, to be perpetuated by a TDA organization, such as an RSC. While an RSC is allowed to wear the insignia and use the same number as a previous infantry division, it is not entitled to its lineage and honors.

Hurricane Sandy

The 99th RSC was awarded the Army Superior Unit Award on 9 May 2016 by the US Army Human Resources Command for its role in the relief support after Hurricane Sandy, from 29 October 2012 thru 31 March 2013. Soldiers who were in direct support of the relief efforts were also awarded the Humanitarian Service Medal as a personal award.

This article contains content in the public domain from U.S. military sources.

Notable personnel
Charles P. Roland

References

Footnotes

Sources 

 
 *

Further reading
The Army Almanac: A Book of Facts Concerning the Army of the United States U.S. Government Printing Office, 1950 at http://www.history.army.mil/html/forcestruc/cbtchron/cbtchron.html
 
 Cavanagh, William C.C., "Dauntless - A History of the 99th Infantry Division" (Taylor Publishing Co. Dallas, TX 1st edition in 1994, reprinted by Fine Books Publishing Co. Charlotte, NC in 1999)   Library of Congress Number: 94-060538

External links
European Center of Military History
Battle Babies: The Story of the 99th Infantry Division
Fact Sheet of the 99th Infantry Division from http://www.battleofthebulge.org
Checkerboard, official publication of 99th Infantry Division Association
78th Army Band, Fort Dix, NJ

099th Infantry Division, U.S.
Infantry Division, U.S. 099
1942 establishments in the United States
Military units and formations established in 1918
Infantry divisions of the United States Army in World War II
Military units and formations disestablished in 1945
United States Army divisions of World War I